
Gmina Dobre is a rural gmina (administrative district) in Radziejów County, Kuyavian-Pomeranian Voivodeship, in north-central Poland.

Villages
Gmina Dobre contains the villages and settlements of Altana, Bodzanowo, Bodzanowo Drugie, Borowo, Bronisław, Byczyna, Byczyna-Kolonia, Czołpin, Dęby, Dobre, Dobre-Kolonia, Dobre-Wieś, Kłonowo, Koszczały, Krzywosądz, Ludwikowo, Morawy, Narkowo, Przysiek, Smarglin, Szczeblotowo and Ułomie.

Neighbouring gminas
Gmina Dobre is bordered by the gminas of Dąbrowa Biskupia, Kruszwica, Osięciny, Radziejów and Zakrzewo.

References
Polish official population figures 2006

Dobre
Gmina Dobre